Oh Mi-ja (born 3 July 1970) is a South Korean long-distance runner. She competed in the women's marathon at the 1996 Summer Olympics and the 2000 Summer Olympics.

References

1970 births
Living people
Athletes (track and field) at the 1996 Summer Olympics
Athletes (track and field) at the 2000 Summer Olympics
South Korean female long-distance runners
South Korean female marathon runners
Olympic athletes of South Korea
Place of birth missing (living people)
Athletes (track and field) at the 2002 Asian Games
Asian Games competitors for South Korea